Maria Osberg (1864–1940) was a Swedish politician (Social Democrat) and trade unionist.

She belonged to the women pioneers of the labour movement, the Social Democratic movement, as well as the trade unionism and women's rights movement within the Social Democratic labour movement in Sweden. She was an active within the organisation of women workers within the trade unions.

She was a co-founder of the Kvinnliga arbetarklubben in 1888 and its chairperson 1890–1892, and co-founder of the Malmö Kvinnliga Diskussionsklubb 1900. She moved to Stockholm in 1901. In Stockholm she was active in the Allmänna Kvinnoklubben. Maria Osberg supported women's issues specifically both as a trade unionist as well as within the party: as a trade unionist, she particularly organised women, and as a social democrat, she worked closely with the women's suffrage movement.

References

Further reading 
 

1864 births
1940 deaths
19th-century Swedish politicians
20th-century Swedish politicians
Swedish social democrats
Swedish trade unionists
Swedish women's rights activists
Swedish suffragists
19th-century Swedish women politicians
20th-century Swedish women politicians